Charles Robert Chandler (July 22, 1911 – June 22, 1982) was an American rower who competed in the 1932 Summer Olympics.

He was born in California and died in Alameda, California.

In 1932, he won the gold medal as member of the American boat in the eights competition.

References

External links
 
 
 
 

1911 births
1982 deaths
American male rowers
Olympic gold medalists for the United States in rowing
Rowers at the 1932 Summer Olympics
Medalists at the 1932 Summer Olympics